This is a list of 833 species in Empis, a genus of dance flies in the family Empididae.

Empis species

Empis abbreviata Loew, 1869 c g
Empis abbrevinervis Meijere, 1911 c g
Empis abcirus Walker, 1849 i c g
Empis abdominalis Daugeron, 1999 c g
Empis aberdarensis Smith, 1971 c g
Empis abrupta Thomson, 1869 c g
Empis achelota Collin, 1941 c g
Empis acinerea Chvála, 1985 c g
Empis acris Daugeron & Grootaert, 2005 c g
Empis adamsi Smith, 1967 c g
Empis adelpha Frey, 1953 c g
Empis adriani Chvála, 1996 c g
Empis adusta Loew, 1869 c g
Empis adzharica Shamshev, 1998 c g
Empis aemula Loew, 1873 c g
Empis aequalis Loew, 1867 c g
Empis aeripes Melander, 1902 i c g
Empis aerobatica Melander, 1902 i c g
Empis aestiva Loew, 1867 c g
Empis affinis Egger, 1860 c g
Empis afipsiensis Shamsev & Kustov, 2008 c g
Empis agasthus Walker, 1849 i c g
Empis alaarchaensis Chvála, 1999 c g
Empis alampra Loew, 1873 c g
Empis alanica Shamshev, 1998 c g
Empis alata Hardy, 1934 c g
Empis alatauensis Chvála, 1999 c g
Empis albens (Wiedemann, 1818) c g
Empis albicans Meigen, 1822 c g
Empis albicincta Loew, 1858 c g
Empis albidiseta Becker, 1907 c g
Empis albifrons Bezzi, 1909 c g
Empis albinervis Meigen, 1822 c g
Empis albipennis Waltl, 1837 c g
Empis albohalteralis Brunetti, 1920 c g
Empis albopilosa Meijere, 1935 g
Empis albopliosa Meijere, 1935 c g
Empis aldrichii Melander, 1902 i c g
Empis algecirasensis Strobl, 1909 c g
Empis algira Macquart, 1838 c g
Empis alpicola Strobl, 1893 c g
Empis alpina Loew, 1867 c g
Empis ambigua Bezzi, 1905 c g
Empis amurensis Shamshev, 1998 c g
Empis amytis Walker, 1849 i c g
Empis anfractuosa Mik, 1884 c g
Empis angorae Collin, 1937 c g
Empis angustipennis Bezzi, 1909 c g
Empis annulipes Wheeler & Melander, 1901 c g
Empis antennata Collin, 1941 c g
Empis anthophila Melander, 1946 i c g
Empis anthracina Bigot, 1888 c g
Empis apfellbecki Strobl, 1898 c g
Empis apicalis Loew, 1865 c g
Empis apophysis Frey, 1953 c g
Empis appalachicola Sinclair, 2013 g
Empis appendiculata Collin, 1938 c g
Empis aprica (Stephens, 1829) c g
Empis aquila White, 1916 c g
Empis ardesiaca Wiedemann, 1822 c g
Empis argentea Daugeron, 2000 c g
Empis argyriventris Smith, 1969 c g
Empis armentalis Collin, 1941 c g
Empis armipes Loew, 1861 i c g
Empis arthritica Melander, 1902 i c g
Empis asema Melander, 1902 i c g
Empis aspina Daugeron & Grootaert, 2005 c g
Empis assalemensis Daugeron, 2000 c g
Empis assimilis Strobl, 1893 c g
Empis ater Macquart, 1827 c g
Empis atra (Fabricius, 1780) g
Empis atratata Daugeron & Grootaert, 2003 c g
Empis atrifemur Wheeler & Melander, 1901 c g
Empis aurata Villers, 1789 c g
Empis autumnalis Saigusa, 1964 c g
Empis azerbaijanica Shamshev, 2006 c g
 Empis azishtauensis Shamshev & Kustov g
Empis azteca Wheeler & Melander, 1901 c g
Empis baldensis Strobl, 1899 c g
Empis barbatoides Melander, 1965 i c g
Empis barbitos Smith, 1971 c g
Empis barotse Smith, 1969 c g
Empis basalis Loew, 1873 c g
Empis basilaris Becker, 1908 c g
Empis basiliaris Becker, 1908 g
Empis bazini Collin, 1926 c g
Empis bechuana Smith, 1969 c g
Empis beckeriana Engel, 1946 c g
Empis bellatoria White, 1916 c g
Empis belousovi Shamshev, 1998 c g
Empis bicolor Bellardi, 1861 c g
Empis bicuspidata Collin, 1927 c g
Empis bigoti Melander, 1902 i c g
Empis bistortae Meigen, 1822 c g
Empis bivittata Wiedemann, 1824 c g
Empis bohemica Chvala & Syrovatka, 1987 c g
Empis borealis Linnaeus, 1758 c g
Empis borisovae Shamshev, 2002 c g
Empis brachysoma Coquillett, 1900 i c g
Empis brandti Shamshev, GrootaertShamshev & Grootaert, 2005 c g
Empis brazzavillensis Daugeron, 2001 c g
Empis brevipennata Macquart, 1827 c g
Empis brevirostris Macquart, 1850 c g
Empis brevis (Loew, 1862) i c g
Empis brincki Smith, 1967 c g
Empis brouni Hutton, 1901 c g
Empis browni Curran, 1931 i c g
Empis brunnea Coquillett, 1903 i c g
Empis brunnipennis Meigen, 1822 c g
Empis bullata Bezzi, 1905 c g
Empis bullifera Kessel and Kessel, 1951 i c g
Empis burmaensis Frey, 1953 c g
Empis caceresensis Daugeron, 2000 c g
Empis cacuminifer Melander, 1902 i c g
Empis caeligena Melander, 1902 i c g
Empis calcarata Bezzi, 1899 c g
Empis calcitrans Scopoli, 1763 c g
Empis calvinia Smith, 1969 c g
Empis cameronensis Daugeron & Grootaert, 2005 c g
Empis canaster Melander, 1902 i g
Empis candida Rossi, 1790 c g
Empis candidata Loew, 1873 c g
Empis cantabrica Strobl, 1899 c g
Empis captus Coquillett, 1895 i c g
Empis carbonaria Brunetti, 1913 c g
Empis caucasica Bezzi, 1909 c g
Empis caudatula Loew, 1867 c g
Empis centralis Brunetti, 1913 c g
Empis cetywayoi Smith, 1969 c g
Empis ceylonica Bezzi, 1904 c g
Empis cherskii Shamshev, 2006 c g
Empis chioptera Meigen, 1804 c g
Empis chiragra Bezzi, 1909 c g
Empis chopardi Daugeron, 1997 c g
Empis chrysocera Collin, 1930 c g
Empis ciliata Fabricius, 1787 c g
Empis ciliatopennata Strobl, 1893 c g
Empis cilicauda Collin, 1960 c g
Empis cincinnatula Loew, 1867 c g
Empis cinctiventris Frey, 1953 c g
Empis cineraria Bezzi, 1914 c g
Empis cinerarius Daugeron & Grootaert, 2003 c g
Empis cinerea Müller, 1776 c g
Empis cingulata Gimmerthal, 1834 c g
Empis claricolor Frey, 1953 c g
Empis clauda Schrank, 1803 c g
Empis clausa Coquillett, 1895 i c g b
Empis clausipyga Saigusa, 1992 c g
Empis cochleata Frey, 1953 c g
Empis cognata Stephens, 1829 g
Empis colonica Walker, 1849 i c g
Empis comantis (Coquillett, 1955) i c g
Empis cometes Steyskal, 1965 i c g
Empis compsogyne Frey, 1953 c g
Empis compta Coquillett, 1895 i c g
Empis concolor Verrall, 1872 c g
Empis confidens Harris, 1776 c g
Empis confirmata (Walker, 1852) c g
Empis confluens Becker, 1907 c g
Empis confusa Loew, 1865 c g
Empis consobrina Syrovatka, 1983 c g
Empis constricta Saigusa, 1992 c g
Empis contigua (Loew, 1864) c g
Empis copiosa Collin, 1933 c g
Empis coptophleboides Frey, 1953 c g
Empis coracina Bezzi, 1909 c g
Empis corcyrica Bezzi, 1909 c g
Empis corvina Loew, 1869 c g
Empis cothurnata Brullé, 1833 c g
Empis coxalis Thomson, 1869 c g
Empis crassa Nowicki, 1868 c g
Empis crassifila Loew, 1858 c g
Empis crassipes Schrank, 1781 c g
Empis ctenocnema Melander, 1945 i c g
Empis cucullata Collin, 1933 c g
Empis cuneipennis Bezzi, 1899 c g
Empis curta Loew, 1869 c g
Empis curticornis Collin, 1960 c g
Empis curvipes Loew, 1868 c g
Empis curvitibia Chvála, 2003 c g
Empis cushcaensis Shamsev, 2001 c g
Empis cuthbertsoni Smith, 1971 c g
Empis cyaneiventris Frey, 1953 c g
Empis cylindeacea Frey, 1953 c g
Empis cyrenaica (Bezzi, 1925) c g
Empis dactylica Melander, 1946 i c g
Empis dahuriensis Shamshev, 2002 c g
Empis dalmatica Oldenberg, 1925 c g
Empis damara Smith, 1969 c g
Empis damascena Collin, 1937 c g
Empis dasycera (Collin, 1960) c g
Empis dasychira Mik, 1878 c g
Empis dasynota Loew, 1869 c g
Empis dasypoda Egger, 1860 c g
Empis dasyprocta Loew, 1867 c g
Empis dasytarsus Smith, 1969 c g
Empis daugeroni Yang, Zhang & Zhang, 2007 c g
Empis decora Meigen, 1822 c g
Empis decorella Chvála, 1981 c g
Empis dedecor Loew, 1869 c g
Empis degener Frey, 1953 c g
Empis delumbis Melander, 1965 i c g
Empis demissa Collin, 1949 c g
Empis depilis Loew, 1873 c g
Empis derbecki Shamshev, 2006 c g
Empis desiderata Melander, 1965 i c g
Empis deterra Walley, 1927 i g
Empis diagramma Meigen, 1835 c g
Empis difficilis Frey, 1953 c g
Empis digramma Meigen, 1835 g
Empis dimidiata Meigen, 1835 c g
Empis dingaani Smith, 1969 c g
Empis discoidalis Collin, 1941 c g
Empis discolor Loew, 1856 c g
Empis discrepans Collin, 1960 c g
Empis disjuncta Collin, 1933 c g
Empis dispar Scholtz, 1851 c g
Empis dispina Chvála, 1996 c g
Empis distans Loew, 1869 i c g
Empis distincta Collin, 1933 c g
Empis divisa Loew, 1869 c g
Empis dixi Steyskal, 1969 i c g
Empis dolabraria Melander, 1902 i c g
Empis dolorosa Wheeler & Melander, 1901 c g
Empis donga Daugeron, Grootaert & Yang, 2003 c g
Empis doronicola Çiftçi, 2014
Empis dubia (Scopoli, 1763) c g
Empis dumetorum Philippi, 1865 c g
Empis duplex Daugeron & Grootaert, 2005 c g
Empis dushanbensis Shamsev, 2001 c g
Empis dusmetii Strobl, 1909 c g
Empis earina Collin, 1960 c g
Empis echigoensis Saigusa, 1964 c g
Empis edithae Daugeron, 1997 c g
Empis edwardsi Smith, 1971 c g
Empis elegans Brunetti, 1913 c g
Empis engeli Chvála, 1999 c g
Empis enodis Melander, 1902 i c g
Empis erosa Loew, 1869 c g
Empis eudamides Walker, 1849 i c g
Empis eumera Loew, 1868 c g
Empis eupeza Loew, 1874 c g
Empis eversmanni Loew, 1873 c g
Empis exilis Coquillett, 1903 i c g
Empis exotica Wiedemann, 1824 c g
Empis fagina Daugeron, 2009 g
Empis falcata Melander, 1902 i c g
Empis fallax Egger, 1860 c g
Empis fasciculata Strobl, 1901 c g
Empis femorata Fabricius, 1798 c g
Empis ferruginea (Meigen, 1822) g
Empis filata Loew, 1873 c g
Empis fimbria Walker, 1852 c g
Empis fiorii Bezzi, 1910 c g
Empis fiumana Egger, 1860 c g
Empis flabilis White, 1916 c g
Empis flava Müller, 1764 c g
Empis flavescens (Rossi, 1794) c g
Empis flavicans Olivier, 1791 c g
Empis flavinervis Philippi, 1865 c g
Empis flavipes (Thunberg, 1784) c g
Empis flavitarsis Roser, 1840 c g
Empis flavobasalis Matsumura, 1915 c g
Empis florisomna Loew, 1856 c g
Empis fovea Saigusa, 1964 c g
Empis frauscheri Strobl, 1901 c g
Empis freidbergi Chvála, 1999 c g
Empis freyi Yang, Zhang & Zhang, 2007 c g
Empis frontalis Coquillett, 1903 i c g
Empis fulvicollis Collin, 1933 c g
Empis fulvipes Wiedemann, 1822 c g
Empis fumida Coquillett, 1900 i c g
Empis funebris Meigen, 1804 c g
Empis funesta Waltl, 1837 c g
Empis fusca Daugeron & Lefebvre, 2015 g
Empis fuscipes Gmelin, 1790 g
Empis gaigeri Gercke, 1886 c g
Empis geneatis (Melander, 1902) i c g b
Empis gentilis Frey, 1953 c g
Empis genualis Strobl, 1893 c g
Empis ghigiana Bezzi, 1924 c g
Empis gibbipes Strobl, 1906 c g
Empis gibbosa Gmelin, 1790 c g
Empis glabratella Collin, 1941 c g
Empis gladiator Melander, 1902 i c g
Empis glandis Smith, 1969 c g
Empis golubi Shamsev, 2001 c g
Empis gooti Chvála, 1994 c g
Empis gorodkovi Shamsev, 2001 c g
Empis gracilipes Philippi, 1865 c g
Empis gracilis Curtis, 1835 c g
Empis gracilitarsis Strobl, 1899 c g
Empis gravipes Loew, 1856 c g
Empis gravis Wiedemann, 1822 c g
Empis grisea Fallén, 1816 c g
Empis griseonigra Brunetti, 1913 c g
 Empis guilanensis Kazerani & Shamshev, 2014 g
Empis gulosa Coquillett, 1895 i c g
Empis gymnopoda Bezzi, 1908 c g
Empis haemi Loew, 1862 c g
Empis haemorrhoica Loew, 1869 c g
Empis hainanensis Yang, Yang & Hu, 2002 c g
Empis hayachinensis Saigusa, 1964 c g
Empis heliciphora Collin, 1937 c g
Empis helophila Loew, 1867 c g
Empis hirsuta Becker, 1915 c g
Empis hirsutipennis Smith, 1976 c g
Empis hirta Loew, 1865 c g
Empis hirticrus Melander, 1927 i c g
Empis hirtipes Wiedemann, 1824 c g
Empis hissarica Chvála, 1999 c g
Empis hoffmannseggii Loew, 1869 c g
Empis holocleroides Frey, 1953 c g
Empis holosericea Walker, 1849 c g
Empis honsyuensis Frey, 1953 c g
Empis hubeiensis Yang & Yang, 1997 c g
Empis humeralis Collin, 1933 c g
Empis humilis Coquillett, 1895 i g
Empis hyalea Melander, 1946 c g
Empis hyalinata Meigen, 1830 c g
Empis hyalipennis Fallén, 1816 c g
Empis hyalogyne Bezzi, 1912 c g
Empis hypandrialis Daugeron, 2000 c g
Empis hystrichopyga Bezzi, 1912 c g
Empis hystrix Loew, 1867 c g
Empis ifranensis Daugeron, 1997 c g
Empis impar Melander, 1946 c g
Empis impennis Strobl, 1902 c g
Empis imputata Collin, 1933 c g
Empis incensa Frey, 1953 c g
Empis inclinata Bezzi, 1912 c g
Empis incompleta Macquart, 1846 c g
Empis inconspicua Brunetti, 1913 c g
Empis incurva Daugeron & Grootaert, 2005 c g
Empis indigirca Chvála, 1999 c g
Empis indissimilis Collin, 1941 c g
Empis indumeni Smith, 1969 c g
Empis induta Bezzi, 1909 c g
Empis inferiseta Daugeron & Grootaert, 2005 c g
Empis infumata Coquillett, 1900 i c g
Empis ingrata Frey, 1953 c g
Empis inopinata Collin, 1960 c g
Empis inornata Loew, 1858 c g
Empis insularis Chvála, 2003 c g
Empis insulata Collin, 1937 c g
Empis intercepta Melander, 1928 c g
Empis itoiana Frey, 1953 c g
Empis jacksoni Smith, 1971 c g
Empis jacobsoni Meijere, 1907 c g
Empis jacutiensis Shamsev, 2001 c g
 Empis janssoni Saigusa, 2012 g
Empis japonica Frey, 1955 c g
Empis johnsoni Melander, 1902 i c g
Empis juxtaripa Daugeron, 2001 c g
Empis kafiri Smith, 1969 c g
Empis kasparyani Shamshev, 1998 c g
Empis kawatiensis Frey, 1953 c g
Empis kazakhstanica Chvála, 1999 c g
Empis keberlei Shamsev, 2001 c g
Empis kerteszi Bezzi, 1900 c g
Empis kirgizica Chvála, 1999 c g
Empis kondaraensis Shamshev, 2006 c g
Empis korana Smith, 1969 c g
Empis kosametensis Daugeron & Grootaert, 2003 c g
Empis kovalevi Shamshev, 1998 c g
Empis kozlovi Shamshev, 1998 c g
Empis krasnodarensis Shamshev & Kustov, 2013 g
Empis kuaensis Daugeron & Grootaert, 2005 c g
Empis kubaniensis Shamsev & Kustov, 2008 c g
Empis kugleri Chvála, 1999 c g
Empis kuntzei Becker, 1910 c g
Empis kvakensis Shamshev, 2003 c g
Empis kyushuensis Frey, 1953 c g
Empis labiata Loew, 1861 i c g
Empis lachaisei Daugeron & Grootaert, 2005 c g
Empis lacotheca Frey, 1955 c g
Empis laeta Loew, 1869 c g
Empis laetabilis Collin, 1926 c g
Empis laevigata Loew, 1864 i c g
Empis lagoensis Chvála, 1996 c g
Empis lamellalta Daugeron & Grootaert, 2005 c g
Empis lamellata Daugeron, 1999 c g
Empis lamellimmanis Daugeron, 1999 c g
Empis lamellornata Daugeron, Grootaert & Yang, 2003 c g
Empis laminata Collin, 1927 c g
Empis lamruensis Daugeron & Grootaert, 2003 c g
Empis landbecki Philippi, 1865 c g
Empis languescens Collin, 1933 c g
Empis laniventris Eschscholtz, 1823 i c g
Empis lata Daugeron & Grootaert, 2005 c g
Empis lateralis Collin, 1933 c g
Empis latiptera Chvála, 1985 c g
Empis latrappensis Ouellett, 1942 i c g
Empis latro Frey, 1953 c g
Empis lepidopus Meigen, 1822 c g
Empis leptargyra Frey, 1953 c g
Empis leptogastra Loew, 1863 i c g b
Empis leptomorion Bezzi, 1909 c g
Empis leucopeza Loew, 1873 c g
Empis leucoptera Meigen, 1804 g
Empis leucostigma Bezzi, 1905 c g
Empis leucotricha Collin, 1960 c g
Empis levicula Coquillett, 1895 i c g
Empis levis Loew, 1873 c g
Empis liberialis Collin, 1933 c g
Empis licenti Séguy, 1956 c g
Empis limata Collin, 1927 c g
Empis lindebergi Saigusa, 2012 g
Empis linderi Oldenberg, 1925 c g
Empis lindneri Smith, 1967 c g
Empis liodes Bezzi, 1909 c g
Empis liosoma Bezzi, 1909 c g
Empis liuxihensis Daugeron, Grootaert & Yang, 2003 c g
Empis livida Linnaeus, 1758 c g
Empis lobalis Thomson, 1869 c g
Empis loewiana Bezzi, 1909 c g
Empis loici Daugeron & Grootaert, 2005 c g
Empis longeoblita Steyskal, 1965 i c g
Empis longicornis Macquart, 1823 c g
Empis longimana Loew, 1871 c g
Empis longipennis Loew, 1868 c g
Empis longirostris Meigen, 1804 c g
Empis longiseta Daugeron & Grootaert, 2005 c g
Empis loripedis Coquillett, 1895 i c g
Empis lucida Zetterstedt, 1838 c g
Empis lucidilabris Bezzi, 1905 c g
Empis lucidiventris Saigusa, 1992 c g
Empis lugens Philippi, 1865 c g
Empis lugubris Loew, 1869 c g
Empis lurida Saigusa, 1992 c g
Empis lutea Meigen, 1804 c g
Empis luteipilosa Saigusa, 1992 c g
Empis luteithorax Collin, 1933 c g
Empis lyneborgi Chvála, 1981 c g
Empis lyra Smith, 1967 c g
Empis lyuchebiensis Shamshev, 2006 c g
Empis macedoniensis (Bequaert, 1962) c g
Empis machipandensis Smith, 1969 c g
Empis macquarti Becker, 1907 c g
Empis macra Loew, 1867 c g
Empis macropalpa Egger, 1860 c g
Empis macropus Loew, 1858 c g
Empis macrorrhyncha Philippi, 1865 c g
Empis maculata Fabricius, 1781 c g
Empis maerens Loew, 1867 c g
Empis makalaka Smith, 1969 c g
Empis makololo Smith, 1969 c g
Empis malaisei Frey, 1953 c g
Empis malleola Becker, 1887 c g
Empis manca Coquillett, 1895 i c g
Empis mandarina Frey, 1953 c g
Empis maraua Smith, 1962 c g
Empis marginata Brunetti, 1917 c g
Empis mariae Syrovatka, 1991 c g
Empis mashona Smith, 1969 c g
Empis matabele Smith, 1969 c g
Empis matilei Daugeron & Charbonnel, 2000 c g
Empis maviti Smith, 1969 c g
Empis mediasiatica Chvála, 1999 c g
Empis mediocris Becker, 1907 c g
Empis mediterranea (Loew, 1864) c g
Empis melanderi Arnaud and Birchim, 1966 i c g
Empis melanopa Stephens, 1829 c g
Empis melanotricha Loew, 1873 c g
Empis mellipes Waltl, 1837 c g
Empis menglunensis Daugeron & Grootaert, 2005 c g
Empis mengyangensis Daugeron & Grootaert, 2005 c g
Empis meridionalis Meigen, 1822 c g
Empis mesogramma Loew, 1867 c g
Empis metapleuralis Bezzi, 1909 c g
Empis micans Schiner, 1868 c g
Empis micropyga Bezzi, 1905 c g
Empis microtheca Frey, 1955 c g
Empis mikii Strobl, 1899 c g
Empis minor Frey, 1953 c g
Empis mira (Bigot, 1880) i c g
Empis miranda Daugeron & Grootaert, 2003 c g
Empis mirandica Chvála, 1981 c g
Empis mirifica Collin, 1960 c g
Empis miripes Collin, 1933 c g
Empis missai Daugeron & Grootaert, 2005 c g
Empis mixopolia Melander, 1902 i c g
Empis modesta Meigen, 1838 c g
Empis modica Collin, 1933 c g
Empis moiwasana (Matsumura, 1915) c g
Empis mollis Syrovatka, 2000 c g
Empis mollita Collin, 1933 c g
Empis moncayoensis Daugeron, 2000 c g
Empis montana Daugeron, 1997 c g
Empis montezuma Wheeler & Melander, 1901 c g
Empis monticola Loew, 1868 c g
Empis montiradicis James, 1942 i c g
Empis montivaga Daugeron, 2000 c g
Empis montywoodi Sinclair, Brooks & Cumming, 2013 g
Empis morenae Strobl, 1899 c g
Empis morio Fabricius, 1794 c g
Empis morosa Meigen, 1822 c g
Empis multinodosa Frey, 1953 c g
Empis multipennata Melander, 1946 c g
Empis multispina Daugeron, 1999 c g
Empis nabucco Çiftçi, 2012 g
Empis nahaeoensis Daugeron & Grootaert, 2003 c g
Empis namaqua Smith, 1969 c g
Empis namwamba Smith, 1971 c g
Empis nanlinga Daugeron, Grootaert & Yang, 2003 c g
Empis nartshuki Shamsev, 2001 c g
Empis natalensis Smith, 1967 c g
Empis neesoonensis Daugeron, 2005 c g
Empis negrobovi Shamsev, 2001 c g
Empis nevadensis Chvála, 1981 c g
Empis nganga Daugeron & Grootaert, 2003 c g
Empis nigerrima Loew, 1862 c g
Empis nigra Villers, 1789 c g
Empis nigricans Meigen, 1804 c g
Empis nigricolor Collin, 1933 c g
Empis nigricoma Loew, 1867 c g
Empis nigricrus Gmelin, 1790 c g
Empis nigrimana Becker, 1907 c g
Empis nigripes Fabricius, 1794 c g
Empis nigrisquama Smith, 1969 c g
Empis nigritarsis Meigen, 1804 c g
Empis nigritibialis Strobl, 1898 c g
Empis nigropilosa Collin, 1937 c g
Empis nimbaensis Daugeron & Grootaert, 2005 c g
Empis nitida Meigen, 1804 c g
Empis nitidissima Strobl, 1893 c g
Empis nitidiventris Loew, 1873 c g
Empis nitidula Zetterstedt, 1859 c g
Empis nodipoplitea Steyskal, 1965 i c g
Empis nondouensis Daugeron, 2002 c g
Empis nuda Loew, 1862 i c g
Empis nuntia Meigen, 1822 c g
Empis obesa Loew, 1861 i c g
Empis obscura Macquart, 1827 c g
Empis obscuripes (Loew, 1873) c g
Empis occlusa Collin, 1960 c g
Empis ochropus Philippi, 1865 c g
Empis odessa Shamsev, 2001 c g
Empis oertus Harris, 1776 c g
Empis ollius Walker, 1849 i c g
Empis omissa Collin, 1933 c g
Empis opaca Meigen, 1804 c g
Empis optabilis Collin, 1933 c g
Empis optiva Collin, 1941 c g
Empis oribi Smith, 1969 c g
Empis ostentator Melander, 1946 c g
Empis otakouensis Miller, 1910 c g
Empis otchontengriensis Shamsev, 2001 c g
Empis otiosa Coquillett, 1895 i c g
Empis oxilara Shamshev, 1998 c g
Empis pachymerina Schiner, 1868 c g
Empis pachymorion Frey, 1935 c g
Empis pachypodiata Bigot, 1889 c g
Empis pachystoma Philippi, 1865 c g
Empis padangensis Daugeron & Grootaert, 2005 c g
Empis pakensis Daugeron & Grootaert, 2003 c g
Empis palaestinensis Engel, 1946 c g
Empis palestinaca (Collin, 1960) c g
Empis pallida Loew, 1861 i c g
Empis pallipes Olivier, 1791 c g
Empis palustris Scopoli, 1763 c g
Empis pan Frey, 1953 c g
Empis pandellei Daugeron, 1999 c g
Empis pandicauda Collin, 1960 c g
Empis papuana Bezzi, 1904 c g
Empis paralis Collin, 1933 c g
Empis parvula Daugeron & Grootaert, 2005 c g
Empis paschalis Gistel, 1848 c g
Empis patagiata Bezzi, 1914 c g
Empis pavesii Bezzi, 1895 c g
Empis pavli Shamshev, 1998 c g
Empis pectinata Sinclair, 2013 g
Empis pedispinosa Daugeron, Grootaert & Yang, 2003 c g
Empis pegasus Osten Sacken, 1887 c g
Empis pellucida Coquillett, 1900 i c g
Empis penicillata Brooks, Sinclair & Cumming, 2013 g
Empis pennata Panzer, 1803 c g
Empis pennipes Linnaeus, 1758 c g
Empis penniventris Bezzi, 1909 c g
Empis peregrina (Melander, 1902) i c g
Empis perpendicularis Loew, 1858 c g
Empis perpusilla Collin, 1933 c g
Empis persimilis Frey, 1953 c g
Empis petulans Becker, 1910 c g
Empis pexata Collin, 1960 c g
Empis phaenomeris Loew, 1868 c g
Empis picena Bezzi, 1899 c g
Empis picipes Meigen, 1804 c g
Empis pilicornis Loew, 1867 c g
Empis pilimana Loew, 1869 c g
Empis pilosa Loew, 1867 c g
Empis pilositarsis Frey, 1953 c g
Empis planetica Collin, 1927 c g
Empis plebeja Loew, 1873 c g
Empis plectrum Melander, 1946 i c g
Empis pleurica (Collin, 1960) c g
Empis plorans Bezzi, 1912 c g
Empis plumata Daugeron, 2001 c g
Empis podagra Melander, 1902 i c g
Empis podagrica Meigen, 1830 c g
Empis poeciloptera Loew, 1861 i c g
Empis poecilosoma Melander, 1946 c g
Empis polita Macquart, 1838 c g
Empis politea Loew, 1863 i g
Empis ponti Chvála, 1996 c g
Empis poplitea Loew, 1863 c g
Empis portia Smith, 1971 c g
Empis praecox Loew, 1867 c g
Empis praevia Collin, 1927 c g
Empis probata Collin, 1928 c g
Empis proboprocera Daugeron, 2000 c g
Empis procera Loew, 1873 c g
Empis prodigiosa Cumming, 2013 g
Empis prodromus Loew, 1867 c g
Empis producta Daugeron, 2005 c g
Empis projecta Daugeron & Grootaert, 2005 c g
Empis prolongata Wang, Li & Yang, 2010 g
Empis prompta Collin, 1933 c g
Empis protarsalis Collin, 1927 c g
Empis proxima Meigen, 1838 c g
Empis pruinosa Wiedemann, 1824 c g
Empis przhevalskii Shamshev, 2006 c g
Empis pseudodecora Strobl, 1898 c g
Empis pseudofasciculata Syrovatka, 2000 c g
Empis pseudomalleola Strobl, 1893 c g
Empis pseudonahaeoensis Daugeron & Grootaert, 2005 c g
Empis pseudonuntia Syrovatka, 1991 c g
Empis pseudoprodromus Collin, 1969 c g
Empis pseudorufiventris (Bequaert, 1962) c g
Empis pseudosemicinerea Daugeron, 2000 c g
Empis pseudosetitarsus Daugeron & Grootaert, 2003 c g
Empis pseudospinotibialis Daugeron & Grootaert, 2003 c g
Empis pteropoda Egger, 1860 c g
Empis ptilocnemis (Loew, 1873) c g
Empis ptilopoda Wiedemann, 1822 c g
Empis pudica (Loew, 1861) i c g
Empis pulchra Saigusa, 1964 c g
Empis pulchripes Loew, 1869 c g
Empis pullata Collin, 1933 c g
Empis punctata Meigen, 1804 c g
Empis purgata (Cederhielm, 1798) c g
Empis pusio Egger, 1860 c g
Empis quadrilineata Gmelin, 1790 c g
Empis quadrimanus Frey, 1953 c g
Empis quadrivittata Lynch Arribalzaga, 1878 c g
Empis rapida Meigen, 1838 c g
Empis raptoria Bezzi, 1912 c g
Empis ratburiensis Daugeron & Grootaert, 2003 c g
Empis rava Loew, 1862 c g
Empis reciproca Walker, 1857 i c g
Empis recordabilis Collin, 1933 c g
Empis retroversa Collin, 1933 c g
Empis richteri Shamshev, 1998 c g
Empis ringdahli (Collin, 1969) c g
Empis rohaceki Chvála, 1994 c g
Empis rohdendorfi Shamsev, 2001 c g
Empis rostrata Brunetti, 1913 c g
Empis ruficornis (Loew, 1864) c g
Empis rufipes Gmelin, 1790 g
Empis rufiventris Meigen, 1838 c g
Empis rustica Fallén, 1816 c g
Empis salicina Lioy, 1864 c g
Empis saltans Engel, 1946 c g
Empis samaruensis Daugeron, 2001 c g
Empis sauteriana Bezzi, 1914 c g
Empis scatophagina Melander, 1902 i c g
Empis scaura Loew, 1867 c g
Empis sciloptera Wiedemann, 1830 c g
Empis scoparia Coquillett, 1903 i c g
Empis scopulifera Bezzi, 1912 c g
Empis scotica Curtis, 1835 c g
Empis scutellata Curtis, 1835 c g
Empis sedelnikovi Shamshev, 2006 c g
Empis semicinerea Loew, 1867 c g
Empis seminitida Frey, 1955 c g
Empis sericans Brullé, 1833 c g
Empis sericata White, 1916 c g
Empis sericea Olivier, 1791 c g
Empis serotina Loew, 1867 c g
Empis serrata Schrank, 1803 c g
Empis sesquata (Ito, 1961) c g
Empis setigera Loew, 1869 c g
Empis setitarsus Smith, 1969 c g
Empis setosa Loew, 1867 c g
Empis sevanensis Shamshev, 2001 c g
Empis shatalkini Shamshev, 2002 c g
Empis shennongana Wang, Li & Yang, 2010 g
Empis shumana Smith, 1962 c g
Empis shushaensis Shamshev, 2001 c g
Empis sibillina Bezzi, 1899 c g
Empis sicula Loew, 1867 c g
Empis similis Becker, 1908 c g
Empis simulium (Nowicki, 1868) c g
Empis sinensis Melander, 1946 c g
Empis singulare Daugeron, 2001 c g
Empis sinuosa Daugeron, 1999 c g
Empis sjoestedti Frey, 1935 c g
Empis skufini Shamshev, 2003 c g
Empis snoddyi Steyskal, 1969 i c g b
Empis socrus Syrovatka, 1983 c g
Empis sordida Loew, 1861 i c g
Empis soror Collin, 1937 c g
Empis sororia (Collin, 1960) c g
Empis spectabilis Loew, 1862 i c g b
Empis specularis Bezzi, 1909 c g
Empis spinifemorata Daugeron, 2000 c g
Empis spinifera Bezzi, 1909 c g
Empis spinosa Daugeron & Grootaert, 2003 c g
Empis spinotibialis Daugeron & Grootaert, 2003 c g
Empis spiralis Collin, 1937 c g
Empis spirifera Bezzi, 1909 c g
Empis spitzeri Chvála, 1977 c g
Empis splendidella Frey, 1953 c g
Empis spungaberaensis Daugeron & Grootaert, 2003 c g
Empis squamipes Coquillett, 1903 c g
Empis staegeri Collin, 1963 c g
Empis stenoptera Loew, 1864 i c g
Empis stercorea Linnaeus, 1758, 1760 c g
Empis stigma Waltl, 1837 c g
Empis stigmatica Frey, 1953 c g
Empis strigata Loew, 1867 c g
Empis styriaca Strobl, 1893 c g
Empis subabreviata Frey, 1953 c g
Empis subciliata Loew, 1871 c g
Empis subcilipes Brunetti, 1913 c g
Empis subclavata (Loew, 1873) c g
Empis suberis Becker, 1907 c g
Empis subinfumata Malloch, 1923 i c g
Empis submetallica Daugeron & Grootaert, 2005 c g
Empis subnitida Becker, 1914 c g
Empis subpatagiata Frey, 1953 c g
Empis subpennata Macquart, 1827 c g
Empis subscutellata Shamshev, 1998 c g
Empis sugonyaevi Shamsev, 2001 c g
Empis surata Kuntze, 1907 c g
Empis syriaca Collin, 1937 c g
Empis syrovatkai Chvála, 1985 c g
Empis syusiroiana Frey, 1953 c g
Empis tajikistanica Chvála, 1999 c g
Empis talyshensis Shamshev, 2006 c g
Empis tanysphyra Loew, 1873 c g
Empis tashkentensis Shamshev, 2006 c g
Empis tasmaniensis Smith, 1989 c g
Empis tenebrosa Coquillett, 1895 c g
Empis tenera Syrovatka, 1983 c g
Empis tenuinervis Bezzi, 1912 c g
Empis tenuipes Loew, 1869 c g
Empis teres Melander, 1902 i c g
Empis tersa Coquillett, 1895 i c g
Empis tessellata Fabricius, 1794 c g
Empis testacea Fabricius, 1805 c g
Empis testiculata Bezzi, 1909 c g
Empis thalhammeri Strobl, 1898 c g
Empis thapensis Daugeron & Grootaert, 2003 c g
Empis theodori (Collin, 1960) c g
Empis thermophila Wiedemann, 1830 c g
Empis thiasotes Melander, 1946 c g
Empis thomsoni Hardy, 1942 c g
E. tianmushana Li, Saigusa & Yang, 2012 g
Empis tibetensis Shamshev, 2006 c g
Empis tibiaculata Daugeron, Grootaert & Yang, 2003 c g
Empis tibialis Hardy, 1934 c g
Empis tortuosa Daugeron, 2005 c g
Empis totipennis Bellardi, 1861 c g
Empis transbaicalica Shamshev, 2006 c g
Empis trianguligera Strobl, 1898 c g
Empis tribulis Collin, 1933 c g
Empis trichoscelis Collin, 1933 c g
Empis tridentata Coquillett, 1901 i c g b
Empis trigramma Wiedemann, 1822 c g
Empis trilineata Gmelin, 1790 c g
Empis triseta Daugeron, 2005 c g
Empis tristis Loew, 1867 c g
Empis trivittata Macquart, 1827 c g
Empis trochanterata Saigusa, 1992 c g
Empis trunca Daugeron, 1999 c g
Empis tuberculata Saigusa, 1992 c g
Empis tumida Meigen, 1822 c g
Empis turanica Shamshev & Grootaert, 2005 c g
Empis turneri Smith, 1969 c g
Empis ulrichi Chvála, 1999 c g
Empis umbrina Wiedemann, 1822 c g
Empis umslangaani Smith, 1969 c g
Empis umzilai Smith, 1969 c g
Empis unicolor Brullé, 1833 c g
Empis unistriata Becker, 1887 c g
Empis univittata Loew, 1867 c g
Empis uruguayensis Lynch Arribalzaga, 1878 c g
Empis urumae Daugeron & Grootaert, 2005 c g
Empis ussuriensis Collin, 1941 c g
Empis uzbekistanica Chvála, 1999 c g
Empis vaginifer Melander, 1902 i c g
Empis valdiviana Philippi, 1865 c g
Empis valentis Coquillett, 1895 i c g
Empis valga Collin, 1938 c g
Empis validis Adams, 1905 c g
Empis variabilis Bigot, 1857 c g
Empis variegata Meigen, 1804 c g
Empis varipes Loew, 1861 i c g
Empis varzobiensis Shamshev, 2006 c g
Empis velutina Bezzi, 1912 c g
Empis velutinella Frey, 1953 c g
Empis verae Smith, 1969 c g
Empis verralli Collin, 1927 c g
Empis verruca Daugeron, 2005 c g
Empis vetula Smith, 1969 c g
Empis vicaria Frey, 1935 c g
Empis vicina Lynch Arribalzaga, 1878 c g
Empis villosipes Frey, 1953 c g
Empis vina Smith, 1971 c g
Empis virgata Coquillett, 1895 i c g
Empis virgulata Daugeron, 2009 g
Empis vitisalutatoris Daugeron & Grootaert, 2005 c g
Empis vitripennis Meigen, 1822 c g
Empis vockerothi Cumming, 2013 g
Empis volsella Sinclair, 2013 g
Empis volucris Wiedemann, 1822 c g
Empis vumba Smith, 1969 c g
Empis waterhousei Hardy, 1934 c g
Empis woitapensis Daugeron & Grootaert, 2005 c g
Empis woodi Collin, 1927 c g
Empis xanthomelas Saigusa, 1992 c g
Empis xanthopyga Schiner, 1868 c g
Empis xanthotibia Saigusa, 1964 c g
Empis xochitl Wheeler & Melander, 1901 c g
Empis xui Daugeron, Grootaert & Yang, 2003 c g
Empis yaroshenkoi Shamsev & Kustov, 2008 c g
Empis zachardai Chvála, 1999 c g
Empis zaslavskii Shamsev, 2001 c g
Empis zhuae Li, Saigusa et Yang, 2012 g
Empis zhuravskii Shamshev, 2006 c g
Empis zimini Shamshev, 2003 c g
Empis zinovjevae Shamshev, 1998 c g
Empis zlobini Shamshev, 1998 c g

Data sources: i = ITIS, c = Catalogue of Life, g = GBIF, b = Bugguide.net

References

Empis